Cornelia Rankin Groves (April 23, 1926 – October 31, 2021) was an American preservationist. She was one of the founders of Savannah Country Day School, in 1955, and was awarded the highest honor of the Historic Savannah Foundation, the Davenport Award, in 2008, for her efforts in support of the Isaiah Davenport House.

Life and career 

Cornelia Susan Rankin was born on April 23, 1926, in Savannah, Georgia, to William Scott Rankin and Hannay Ellis. Her father died when she was five years old; her mother lived until the age of 98.

She was a graduate of Savannah's Pape School and Randolph-Macon Women's College in Lynchburg, Virginia. 

Rankin married Robert Walker Groves. He died in 2000, aged 82. They had two children: Robert III and Susan.

A lifelong resident of Savannah, she fought in support of the Historic Savannah Foundation to get funding to assist in the restoration of the Isaiah Davenport House in the city's Columbia Square. She was also a member of the Colonial Dames of Georgia, along with her sister, Ruth, and the Trustees' Garden Club.

During World War II, Groves "rolled bandages and ran the canteen."

In 1955, Groves was one of the parents involved in the founding of the Savannah Country Day School, which originated from the Pape School.

Groves and her husband were also involved in Scottish Games in North Carolina.

In the 1990s, when the Davenport House was in need of funding, Groves and Clare Ellis established an endowment. They regularly met at Groves' home to formulate fundraising ideas, and their goal was $1 million.

Groves founded the Friends of the Davenport House in 2003.

Historic Savannah Foundation awarded Groves their highest honor, the Davenport Award, in 2008.

Groves was used as a source for Polly Cooper and Laura Lawton's book Savannah's Preservation Story (2016).

Death and legacy 
Groves died on October 31, 2021, aged 95. She is interred in Savannah's Bonaventure Cemetery, alongside her husband.

References 

1926 births
2021 deaths
People from Savannah, Georgia
Randolph College alumni
Historical preservationists
20th-century American women
21st-century American women